Voice of America is an American international radio and television network

Voice of America may also refer to:
Voice of America (Frith, Ostertag and Minton album), 1982
Voice of America (Little Steven album), 1984
The Voice of America (album), a 1980 album by Cabaret Voltaire
"Voice of America", a song by Asia from their 1985 album Astra
The Voice of America, pre-production working title of The Voice (American TV series)

See also 
VOA (disambiguation)
America's Voice (disambiguation)